Glenn Thatcher Hyde (born March 14, 1951 in Boston, Massachusetts) is a former American football offensive tackle in the National Football League (NFL). Nick-named "Lumpy," he played ten seasons in the NFL, mainly for the Denver Broncos. He also played in the World Football League for the Chicago Fire and the Charlotte Hornets, and in the United States Football League for the Denver Gold and the Chicago Blitz.

References

1951 births
Living people
Players of American football from Boston
American football offensive tackles
Pittsburgh Panthers football players
Denver Broncos players
Baltimore Colts players
Seattle Seahawks players
Kansas City Chiefs players
Chicago Fire (WFL) players
Denver Gold players
Chicago Blitz players
Charlotte Hornets (WFL) players